Lonesomeville is the second studio album by Canadian country music artist Chris Cummings. It was released by Warner Music Canada on February 15, 2000. The album peaked at number 17 on the RPM Country Albums chart.

Track listing
"That'll Teach Her" (Chris Cummings, Gary Burr) – 2:33
"A Little at a Time" (Cummings, Burr) – 3:30
"No One Hurts Me More Than Me" (Cummings, Rod Lewis) – 2:20
"Lonesomeville" (Paul Thorn, Billy Maddox) – 4:04
"Temporarily Forever Mine" (Cummings, Rick Scott, Phillip Douglas) – 2:37
"It Looks Like Pain" (Cummings, Scott, Patrick Howell) – 2:45
"Hammer and Nail" (Thorn, Maddox) – 3:19
"Sunday Best" (Cummings) – 3:11
"Uncle" (Cummings, Don Schlitz) – 2:40
"You Don't Say" (Cummings, Scott, Howell, Larry Dean Scott) – 3:14
"Home" (Cummings, Lewis, Tim Grogan, Greg Hayes) – 3:17

Chart performance

References

External links
Lonesomeville

2000 albums
Chris Cummings albums
Albums produced by Jim Ed Norman